Albicans  (Latin, 'whitening') may refer to:

 Corpus albicans, the regressed form of the corpus luteum in ovaries
 Species with binomial names including albicans: see

See also
 Whitening (disambiguation)